The George Aloe and the Sweepstake is Child ballad 285. In 1595, a ballad was entered into the Stationers' Register with the note that it was to be sung to the tune of The George Aloe and the Sweepstake. The ballad tells of the battles with a pirate ship. Several variations of the ballad exist.

Synopsis
The George Aloe and the Sweepstake were merchant ships bound for Safee.  The George Aloe took anchor, while the Sweepstake went ahead. and, after an exchange of hails, was taken by a French man-o-war.  The George Aloe received the news, followed, exchanged the same hails, and defeated the ship.

The American variant The Coast of High Barbaree includes only one ship, which exchanges hails with a Barbary pirate and defeats it, as the George Aloe does with the French ship.

See also
 List of the Child Ballads

References

External links

The George Aloe and the Sweepstake
The Coasts of High Barbary, with history on the variants

Child Ballads
Songs about pirates
Year of song unknown
Songwriter unknown